Epichorista elephantina is a species of moth of the family Tortricidae. It is found in New Zealand.

The wingspan is 23–27 mm. The forewings are whitish ochreous with a cloudy central streak, more yellowish ochreous from the base to beyond the middle and containing several small dots of black scales. There is an ill-defined longitudinal blackish line in the disc, as well as some fine scattered black dots towards the hindmargin. The hindwings are dark grey in females and whitish in males.

References

Moths described in 1885
Epichorista
Moths of New Zealand
Taxa named by Edward Meyrick
Endemic fauna of New Zealand
Endemic moths of New Zealand